North Bend Township is one of nine townships in Starke County, in the U.S. state of Indiana. As of the 2010 census, its population was 1,394 and it contained 862 housing units.

Geography

Cities, towns, villages
 Bass Lake (east half)

Unincorporated towns
 Ora at 
 Winona at 
(This list is based on USGS data and may include former settlements.)

Adjacent townships
 Washington Township (north)
 Union Township, Marshall County (east)
 Aubbeenaubbee Township, Fulton County (southeast)
 Tippecanoe Township, Pulaski County (south)
 Franklin Township, Pulaski County (southwest)
 California Township (west)
 Center Township (northwest)

Cemeteries
The township contains these three cemeteries: North Bend, North Union and Ora.

Airports and landing strips
 Bennett Strip Airport

Lakes
 Black Lake
 Hartz Lake
 Langenbaum Lake

Major highways

School districts
 Culver Community Schools Corporation

Political districts
 Indiana's 2nd congressional district
 State House District 17
 State Senate District 5

References
 United States Census Bureau 2008 TIGER/Line Shapefiles
 United States Board on Geographic Names (GNIS)
 IndianaMap

External links
 Indiana Township Association
 United Township Association of Indiana

Townships in Starke County, Indiana
Townships in Indiana